Dunboyne railway station is a railway station serving the town of Dunboyne in County Meath, Ireland.

Dunboyne station features car parking for up to 300 cars, operated by APCOA Parking, enabling it to serve as a small park & ride stop for commuters to Dublin.

Services
It is a station on the Docklands to M3 Parkway commuter service (Peak Times Monday to Friday) and Clonsilla to M3 Parkway shuttle service (at all other times).

Passengers transfer at Clonsilla:

to travel at non peak times (including Saturday and Sunday) towards Dublin city centre.
to travel to Maynooth and both Leixlip stations. Transfer at Maynooth for InterCity services to Sligo.
to travel to Drumcondra. Only Maynooth to Dublin services serve Drumcondra.

History
The original Dunboyne station opened in August 1862 on the Clonsilla-Navan railway line, but was closed in January 1947. Since then the town has not been served by passenger trains, with the old station being converted into a private residence.

However, in 2005, the Irish Government announced that, as part of its Transport 21 plan, the line between Clonsilla and Navan would be reopened for passenger trains in two stages, with the first stage including a new station for Dunboyne, which opened in September 2010.

The station was officially opened on 2 September 2010, and the first regularly scheduled train to the station arrived on 3 September.

Gallery

See also
 List of railway stations in Ireland

References

External links
Irish Rail Dunboyne Station website

Iarnród Éireann stations in County Meath
Railway stations in County Meath
Railway stations opened in 2010